Sogesco is the largest private transportation company in Quebec, Canada.

Transport Scolaire Sogesco Inc., founded in 1989, specializes in school transportation, but also provides paratransit and urban transit services. It employs more than 1000 people and has 24 subsidiaries, each of which operates in the territory of one or more school boards in Quebec and Ontario.

Subsidiaries
Autobus ABC, Bedford
Autobus Acton, Saint-Théodore-d'Acton
Autobus des Cantons, Fleurimont
Autobus de l'Énergie, Saint-Georges-de-Champlain
Autobus des Érables, Saint-Georges 
Autobus du Fer, Sept-Îles 
Autobus du Village, Gatineau
Autobus Granby, Granby
Autobus la Diligence, Sainte-Adèle 
Autobus la Montréalaise, Laval
Autobus Lasalle, Shawville   
Autobus Longueuil, Longueuil
Autobus Manic, Baie-Comeau
Autobus Québec Métro 2000, Québec
Autobus R. Pouliot, Fleurimont
Autobus Rive Sud, Longueuil 
Autobus Venise, Salaberry-de-Valleyfield
Autobus Voltigeurs, Drummondville
Autobus Yamaska (131354 Canada), Farnham
Baie Transport, Gatineau
Bigras Transport, Gatineau
Camille Mailloux R.D.L., Rivière-du-Loup 
Compagnie de Transport Maskoutaine, Saint-Hyacinthe  
Entreprises P. Dorais, Dunham
Eugène Dolbec & Fils, Saint-Jean-sur-Richelieu 
Renfrew County Bus Lines (2006), Renfrew, ON    
Valley Bus Lines, Kemptville, ON
PMD Brault, Beauharnois, Québec
Autobus Lemay, Drummondville, Québec
Multi-Transport, Drummondville, Québec
Autobus Gaston & Sylvio Hébert, Wickham, Québec

References

External links
  Official site officiel of Transport Scolaire Sogesco

Bus transport in Quebec
Bus transport in Ontario
Companies based in Quebec
Transport in Drummondville